Frank Muniz may refer to:

Frankie Muniz (born 1985), American actor
Frank Moniz (1911–2004), U.S. soccer player